John E. Fenton (1898-1974) was a judge and president of Suffolk University in Boston, Massachusetts from 1965 to 1970.

John E. Fenton, Sr. was born in Lawrence, Massachusetts in 1898 and graduated the College of the Holy Cross and then from Boston College Law School in 1924 with a Juris Doctor. Fenton taught at Lawrence High School while attending the Suffolk Evening Division. Fenton served on the Suffolk University Board of Trustees for sixteen years before serving as president of the university from 1965 to 1970. He had previously served as the Chief Justice of the Massachusetts Land Court from 1937-1965. Fenton's son, John E. Fenton, Jr. was also a judge and a professor at Suffolk Law School for over fifty years. The John E. Fenton building at Suffolk University is named in President Fenton's honor.

References

Suffolk University Law School alumni
College of the Holy Cross alumni
Presidents of Suffolk University
1898 births
1974 deaths
20th-century American academics